Rice Krispies (known as Rice Bubbles in Australia and New Zealand) is a breakfast cereal, marketed by Kellogg's in 1927 and released to the public in 1928. Rice Krispies are made of crisped rice (rice and sugar paste that is formed into rice shapes or "berries", cooked, dried and toasted), and expand forming very thin and hollowed out walls that are crunchy and crisp. When milk is added to the cereal the walls tend to collapse, creating the "snap, crackle and pop" sounds.

Rice Krispies cereal has a long advertising history, with the elf cartoon characters Snap, Crackle and Pop touting the brand. In 1963, The Rolling Stones recorded a short song for a Rice Krispies television advertisement.

Background
Rice Krispies are made by the Kellogg Company. The "Snap, Crackle and Pop" slogan was in use by 1939 when the cereal was advertised as staying "crackly crisp in milk or cream...not mushy!" with claims that the cereal would remain floating (without sinking to the bottom of the bowl) even after 2 hours in milk. They were not a shredded or flaked cereal type, but were instead created by a patented process that Kellogg's called "oven-popping".

The original patent called for using partially dried grain, which could be whole or broken, that would have 15–30% moisture which could then be shaped by existing processes for cereal production that include rolling, flaking, shredding, etc. After being processed to the desired shape the grain is dried to around 5–14% moisture content at which stage the grain will expand when subjected to a high temperature creating a light, low-density product that is crisp and easy to chew.

Ingredients
Rice Krispies contain rice, sugar, salt, malt flavoring, iron, ascorbic acid (vitamin C), alpha tocopherol acetate (vitamin E), niacinamide, vitamin A palmitate, pyridoxine hydrochloride (vitamin B6), riboflavin (vitamin B2), thiamin hydrochloride (vitamin B1), folic acid, vitamin B12 (as cyanocobalamin) and vitamin D.

According to Kellogg's, the rice used in the US version of the cereal is grown in the states of Louisiana and Arkansas.

Health claims
In 2010 the Kellogg Company was found by the Federal Trade Commission to be making unsubstantiated and misleading health claims in advertising on Rice Krispies boxes. Claims made by the company included "now helps support your child's immunity" and "has been improved to include antioxidants and nutrients that your family needs to help them stay healthy." The FTC had previously found fault with Kellogg's claims that Frosted Mini-Wheats cereal improved children's attentiveness by nearly 20%.

Variants

Present day
The names of other products within the Rice Krispies family vary depending on where they are sold:
 Cocoa Krispies (called Coco Pops in the UK, Ireland, South Africa, Australia, New Zealand, Greece and Italy), a chocolate flavored version (sold worldwide)
 Rice Krispies with Vanilla Flavor, sold in Canada and South Africa
 Chocolate and Vanilla Rice Krispies, a cereal containing mixed flavor Rice Krispies (introduced in 2007)
 Rice Krispies Treats Cereal, contains bunches of krispies fused together by a marshmallow coating (introduced in March 1993)
 Strawberry Pops, sold in South Africa
 Kellogg's Strawberry Krispies
Many generic versions of Rice Krispies (including frosted and chocolate variants) have been produced by other manufacturers under many different names.

Discontinued
 Frosted Rice Krispies (called Ricicles in the UK and Ireland)
 Rice Krispies with dehydrated miniature marshmallows (Marshmallow Rice Krispies, also known as Marshmallow Krispies, along with a tropical version, Fruity Marshmallow Krispies), were sold briefly in the United States and Canada. Despite surviving longer in Canada than the United States, they were discontinued during the late 1990s.
Rice Krispies with strawberry flavor included 1983's Strawberry Krispies and 1997's Strawberry Rice Krispies. Australia had Strawberry Pops, a strawberry version of Rice Bubbles, which was discontinued in the mid-1970s, along with other similarly coloured and sweetened foods, due to concerns about the additives causing cancer. Banana-flavored Rice Krispies, including Banana Bubbles and Banana Krispies, have also been sold in the past.
Razzle Dazzle Rice Krispies, an extremely sweet, artificially-colored cereal, was sold from late 1997 to 1999.
Apple Cinnamon Rice Krispies, a cereal flavored with apple and cinnamon, was sold in the early 1990s.
Rice Krispies with berry flavors, including Berry Krispies and Berry Rice Krispies.
Rice Krispies with honey, Honey Rice Krispies, was sold in the UK and Canada for a short period of time in the late 1990s.

In the late 1990s, Kellogg's sold Halloween versions of their regular cereal. This included Halloween Rice Krispies which featured a variety of orange krispies.

Rice Krispies Treats and similar sweets
In 1939, Kellogg's employee Mildred Day concocted and published a recipe for a Camp Fire Girls bake sale consisting of Rice Krispies, melted marshmallows, and margarine. It has remained a very popular snack dubbed Rice Krispies Treats. Kellogg's themselves have now produced commercial varieties of both marshmallow and chocolate-based treats under the name Rice Krispies Squares in Canada and the UK, as well as versions under the original Rice Krispies Treats name sold in the United States.

Kellogg's also produces commercial versions of Rice Krispie treats known as Rice Krispies Squares, cereal bars, and a multi-grain cereal known as Rice Krispies Multi-Grain (formerly Muddles) sold on the UK market. Primarily aimed at children, Multi-Grain contains a prebiotic and is claimed by Kellogg's to promote good digestive health.

In Australia, Rice Bubbles are found in a well-known homemade sweet, the chocolate crackle. This is often found at fetes and consists of Rice Bubbles, copha and cocoa, amongst other things. In the UK, a similar treat is made of Rice Krispies and melted chocolate. White Christmas is another Australian sweet made with Rice Bubbles, milk powder, copha and dried fruit.

South African controversy 
In 2018 the South African branch of Kellogg's replaced the classic Rice Krispies with Rice Krispies Vanilla, thereby discontinuing the production of the original Rice Krispies in the country. This change was met with a lot of public complaints.

Kellogg's South Africa posted the following on their Facebook page in response to the outrage of South African consumers: "Rice Krispies Vanilla is a new product that was launched in South Africa in June this year, responding to many of our customers’ calls for more innovation and variety. With Rice Krispies Vanilla we have moved from a single grain to a multi-grain formula which has additional nutritional benefits and allows us to source locally, promoting local farmers and jobs. The New recipe also contains 9 vitamins & iron. While we fully understand that in some instances people prefer the original plain Rice Krispies, several different recipes were tested in market, and the vanilla formulation was significantly preferred by our local consumers. We will continue to provide opportunities for testing and tasting in-store to share our new taste with consumers."

The new Rice Krispies Vanilla now contained 21.7 g sugar for every 100 g, up from only 9 g previously, and the taste was very poorly received. Despite the public's obvious and vocal disgust with the product, Kellogg's decided to stay firm in their decision on replacing the original Rice Krispies with the new Rice Krispies Vanilla, until 2020 when Kellogg's returned the original product to shelves.

Zandi Mposelwa, head of external relations at Kellogg Sub Saharan Africa, released the following statement: "We have decided to relaunch [the original Rice Krispies] in the market, whilst keeping the Rice Krispies Vanilla variant to ensure that we meet different consumer needs for variety. We are importing the product from the UK because we no longer have manufacturing capability to manufacture the product in South Africa.”

This meant that South African consumers would be paying more for the standard Rice Krispies: a 510 g box of imported original Rice Krispies will cost around ZAR 70. A 600 g box of Vanilla Rice Krispies currently costs ZAR 47.99.

Marketing history

Cartoon mascots 

Snap! Crackle! and Pop!, the animated cartoon mascots for Rice Krispies, were created by illustrator Vernon Grant in the 1930s.  The original gnome-like Snap first appeared in 1933 on a package of Kellogg's Rice Krispies.  Crackle and Pop came later, and since 1939, the three have been together in many forms of advertising, including radio, movie shorts, and comic strips.  An updated version of the elf-like Snap Crackle and Pop appeared for the first time on television in 1960; before that it was advertised by Woody Woodpecker.  They are the first and longest-running cartoon characters to represent a Kellogg's product.

Taglines 
Snap! Crackle! Pop! Rice Krispies! (1966–present)
It's Going to Be a Rice Day (1960s)
The taste that tickles (early 1990s-2000s, Canadian)
Snap! Crackle! Pop! Nutritious! (late 1997–1999, Canadian)
What do your Rice Krispies say to you? (1990–1998)
Let someone in on the fun! (1997-1998)
Celebrating the joy of kids growing through interaction. (1998, PBS Sponsorship for Teletubbies)
Snap, Crackle, Pop. Wake up call to the world. (1998–2001)
Childhood is Calling (2006–present)
Moms Just Know (2007–present)

"Snap, crackle and pop" sound 
The cereal is marketed on the basis of the noises it produces when milk is added to the bowl. The onomatopoeic noises differ by country and language:

English: Snap! Crackle! Pop!
Danish: Pyf! Paaf! Pof!
Swedish: Piff! Paff! Puff!
German: Knisper! Knasper! Knusper!
Spanish: Pim! Pam! Pum!
Finnish: Riks! Raks! Poks!
French: Cric! Crac! Croc!
Dutch: Pif! Paf! Pof!
Afrikaans: Knap! Knetter! Knak!
Belgium: Poos! Pas! Pes!

Prizes and premiums 
In 1938 and 1939, Vernon Grant, the illustrator who created Snap, Crackle and Pop, produced a set of six illustrations of Mother Goose themes including Humpty Dumpty, Jack and Jill, Jack Be Nimble, Little Jack Horner, Peter Peter Pumpkin Eater, and Twinkle Twinkle Little Star that were offered as premiums in exchange for two Rice Krispies boxtops and a three-cent stamp.

See also

 List of breakfast cereals

References

External links

 
 How it works
 Marshmallow Rice Krispies info and commercial
 Why Rice Krispies go "Snap! Crackle! Pop!"

Kellogg's cereals
Products introduced in 1928
Rice dishes